The following is a list of Registered Historic Places in Calhoun County, Michigan.



|}

Former listing

|}

See also

List of Michigan State Historic Sites in Calhoun County, Michigan
National Register of Historic Places listings in Michigan
Listings in neighboring counties: Barry, Branch, Eaton, Hillsdale, Jackson, Kalamazoo, St. Joseph

References

 
Calhoun County
Calhoun County, Michigan
 
Tourist attractions in Calhoun County, Michigan